Savages is the fifth studio album by Canadian rock band Theory of a Deadman. It was released on July 29, 2014.

Track listing

Personnel
Theory of a Deadman
 Tyler Connolly - vocals, guitar, mandolin, talk-box on "Drown"
 Dave Brenner - guitar, backing vocals
 Dean Back - bass, backing vocals
 Joey Dandeneau - drums, percussion, backing vocals

Guest musicians
 Alice Cooper - guest vocals on "Savages"
 Joe Don Rooney - guest vocals/additional guitar on "Livin' My Life Like a Country Song"

Production
Howard Benson - producer
Mike Plotnikoff - recording
Chris Lord-Alge - mixing
Ted Jensen - mastering

Charts

Weekly charts

Year-end charts

Singles

References

2014 albums
Theory of a Deadman albums
Roadrunner Records albums
19 Recordings albums